The Stockton and Darlington Railway  (S&DR) was a railway company that operated in north-east England from 1825 to 1863.  The world's first public railway to use steam locomotives, its first line connected collieries near Shildon with Darlington and Stockton-on-Tees in County Durham, and was officially opened on 27 September 1825. The movement of coal to ships rapidly became a lucrative business, and the line was soon extended to a new port at Middlesbrough. While coal waggons were hauled by steam locomotives from the start, passengers were carried in coaches drawn by horses until carriages hauled by steam locomotives were introduced in 1833.

The S&DR was involved in the building of the East Coast Main Line between York and Darlington, but its main expansion was at Middlesbrough Docks and west into Weardale and east to Redcar. It suffered severe financial difficulties at the end of the 1840s and was nearly taken over by the York, Newcastle and Berwick Railway, before the discovery of iron ore in Cleveland and the subsequent increase in revenue meant it could pay its debts.

The company was taken over by the North Eastern Railway in 1863, transferring  of line and about 160 locomotives, but continued to operate independently as the Darlington Section until 1876. The opening of the S&DR was seen as proof of the effectiveness of steam railways and its anniversary was celebrated in 1875, 1925 and 1975. Much of the original route is now served by the Tees Valley Line, operated by Northern.

Genesis

Origins

Coal from the inland mines in southern County Durham used to be taken away on packhorses, and then horse and carts as the roads were improved. A canal was proposed by George Dixon in 1767 and again by John Rennie in 1815, but both schemes failed. Meanwhile, the port of Stockton-on-Tees, from which the Durham coal was transported onwards by sea, had invested considerably during the early 19th century in straightening the Tees in order to improve navigation on the river downstream of the town and was subsequently looking for ways to increase trade to recoup those costs.

A few years later, a canal was proposed on a route that bypassed Darlington and Yarm, and a meeting was held in Yarm to oppose the route. The Welsh engineer George Overton was consulted, and he advised building a tramroad. Overton carried out a survey and planned a route from the Etherley and Witton Collieries to Shildon, and then passing to the north of Darlington to reach Stockton. The Scottish engineer Robert Stevenson was said to favour the railway, and the Quaker Edward Pease supported it at a public meeting in Darlington on 13 November 1818, promising a five per cent return on investment. Approximately two-thirds of the shares were sold locally, and the rest were bought by Quakers nationally.  A private bill was presented to Parliament in March 1819, but as the route passed through Earl of Eldon's estate and one of the Earl of Darlington's fox coverts, it was opposed and defeated by 13 votes.

Overton surveyed a new line that avoided Darlington's estate and agreement was reached with Eldon, but another application was deferred early in 1820, as the death of King George III had made it unlikely a bill would pass that parliamentary year. The promoters lodged a bill on 30 September 1820, the route having changed again as agreement had not been reached with Viscount Barrington about the line passing over his land. The railway was unopposed this time, but the bill nearly failed to enter the committee stage as the required four-fifths of shares had not been sold. Pease subscribed £7,000; from that time he had considerable influence over the railway and it became known as "the Quaker line". The Act that received royal assent on 19 April 1821 allowed for a railway that could be used by anyone with suitably built vehicles on payment of a toll, that was closed at night, and with which land owners within  could build branches and make junctions; no mention was made of steam locomotives. This new railway initiated the construction of more railway lines, causing significant developments in railway mapping and cartography, iron and steel manufacturing, as well as in any industries requiring more efficient transportation.

George Stephenson
Concerned about Overton's competence, Pease asked George Stephenson, an experienced enginewright of the collieries of Killingworth, to meet him in Darlington. On 12 May 1821 the shareholders appointed Thomas Meynell as chairman and Jonathan Backhouse as treasurer; a majority of the managing committee, which included Thomas Richardson, Edward Pease and his son Joseph Pease, were Quakers. The committee designed a seal, showing waggons being pulled by a horse, and adopted the Latin motto  ("At private risk for public service"). By 23 July 1821 it had decided that the line would be a railway with edge rails, rather than a plateway, and appointed Stephenson to make a fresh survey of the line. Stephenson recommended using malleable iron rails, even though he owned a share of the patent for the alternative cast iron rails, and both types were used. Overton had kept himself available, but had no further involvement and the shareholders elected Stephenson Engineer on 22 January 1822, with a salary of £660 per year.

Stephenson advocated the use of steam locomotives on the line. Pease visited Killingworth in mid-1822 and the directors visited Hetton colliery railway, on which Stephenson had introduced steam locomotives. A new bill was presented, requesting Stephenson's deviations from the original route and the use of "loco-motives or moveable engines", and this received assent on 23 May 1823. The Skerne Bridge over the River Skerne was designed by the Durham architect Ignatius Bonomi.

In 1823, Stephenson and Pease opened Robert Stephenson and Company, a locomotive works at Forth Street, Newcastle, from which the following year the S&DR ordered two steam locomotives and two stationary engines. On 16 September 1825, with the stationary engines in place, the first locomotive, Locomotion No. 1, left the works, and the following day it was advertised that the railway would open on 27 September 1825.

Opening

The cost of building the railway had greatly exceeded the estimates. By September 1825, the company had borrowed £60,000 in short-term loans and needed to start earning an income to ward off its creditors. A railway coach, named Experiment, arrived on the evening of 26 September 1825 and was attached to Locomotion No. 1, which had been placed on the rails for the first time at Aycliffe Lane station following the completion of its journey by road from Newcastle earlier that same day. Pease, Stephenson and other members of the committee then made an experimental journey to Darlington before taking the locomotive and coach to Shildon in preparation for the opening day, with James Stephenson, George's elder brother, at the controls. On 27 September, between 7 am and 8 am, 12 waggons of coal were drawn up Etherley North Bank by a rope attached to the stationary engine at the top, and then let down the South Bank to St Helen's Auckland. A waggon of flour bags was attached and horses hauled the train across the Gaunless Bridge to the bottom of Brusselton West Bank, where thousands watched the second stationary engine draw the train up the incline. The train was let down the East Bank to Mason's Arms Crossing at Shildon Lane End, where Locomotion No. 1, Experiment and 21 new coal waggons fitted with seats were waiting.

The directors had allowed room for 300 passengers, but the train left carrying between 450 and 600 people, most travelling in empty waggons but some on top of waggons full of coal. Brakesmen were placed between the waggons, and the train set off, led by a man on horseback with a flag. It picked up speed on the gentle downward slope and reached , leaving behind men on field hunters (horses) who had tried to keep up with the procession. The train stopped when the waggon carrying the company surveyors and engineers lost a wheel; the waggon was left behind and the train continued. The train stopped again, this time for 35 minutes to repair the locomotive and the train set off again, reaching  before it was welcomed by an estimated 10,000 people as it came to a stop at the Darlington branch junction. Six waggons of coal were distributed to the poor, workers stopped for refreshments and many of the passengers from Brusselton alighted at Darlington, to be replaced by others.

Two waggons for the Yarm Band were attached, and at 12:30 pm the locomotive started for Stockton, now hauling 31 vehicles with 550 passengers. At Eaglescliffe near Yarm crowds waited for the train to cross the Stockton to Yarm turnpike. Approaching Stockton, running alongside the turnpike as it skirted the western edge of Preston Park, it gained speed and reached  again, before a man clinging to the outside of a waggon fell off and his foot was crushed by the following vehicle. As work on the final section of track to Stockton's quayside was still ongoing, the train halted at the temporary passenger terminus at St John's Well 3 hours, 7 minutes after leaving Darlington. The opening ceremony was considered a success and that evening 102 people sat down to a celebratory dinner at the Town Hall.

Early operations
The line was single track with four passing loops each mile; square sleepers supported each rail separately so that horses could walk between them. Stone was used for the sleepers to the west of Darlington and oak to the east; Stephenson would have preferred all of them to have been stone, but the transport cost was too high as they were quarried in the Auckland area. The railway opened with the company owing money and unable to raise further loans; Pease advanced money twice early in 1826 so the workers could be paid. By August 1827 the company had paid its debts and was able to raise more money; that month the Black Boy branch opened and construction began on the Croft and Hagger Leases branches. During 1827 shares rose from £120 at the start to £160 at the end.

The line was initially used to carry coal to Darlington and Stockton, carrying 10,000 tons in the first three months and earning nearly £2,000. In Stockton, the price of coal dropped from 18 to 12 shillings, and by the beginning of 1827 was 8 shillings 6 pence (8s 6d). At first, the drivers had been paid a daily wage, but after February 1826 they were paid d per ton per mile; from this they had to pay assistants and fireman and to buy coal for the locomotive. The 1821 Act had received opposition from the owners of collieries on the River Wear who supplied London and feared competition, and it had been necessary to restrict the rate for transporting coal destined for ships to d per ton per mile, which had been assumed would make the business uneconomic. There was interest from London for 100,000 tons a year, so the company began investigations in September 1825. In January 1826, the first staith opened at Stockton, designed so waggons over a ship's hold could discharge coal from the bottom. About 18,500 tons of coal was transported to ships in the year ending June 1827, and this increased to over 52,000 tons the following year, 44.5% of the total carried.

The locomotives were unreliable at first. Soon after opening, Locomotion No. 1 broke a wheel, and it was not ready for traffic until 12 or 13 October; Hope, the second locomotive, arrived in November 1825 but needed a week to ready it for the line – the cast-iron wheels were a source of trouble. Two more locomotives of a similar design arrived in 1826; that August, 16s 9d was spent on ale to motivate the men maintaining the engines. By the end of 1827, the company had also bought Chittaprat from Robert Wilson and Experiment from Stephenson. Timothy Hackworth, locomotive superintendent, used the boiler from the unsuccessful Chittaprat to build the Royal George in the works at Shildon; it started work at the end of November. John Wesley Hackworth later published an account stating that locomotives would have been abandoned were it not for the fact that Pease and Thomas Richardson were partners with Stephenson in the Newcastle works, and that when Timothy Hackworth was commissioned to rebuild Chittaprat it was "as a last experiment" to "make an engine in his own way". Both Tomlinson and Rolt state this claim was unfounded and the company had shown earlier that locomotives were superior to horses, Tomlinson showing that coal was being moved using locomotives at half the cost of horses. Robert Young states that the company was unsure as to the real costs as they reported to shareholders in 1828 that the saving using locomotives was 30 per cent. Young also showed that Pease and Richardson were both concerned about their investment in the Newcastle works and Pease unsuccessfully tried to sell his share to George Stephenson.

New locomotives were ordered from Stephenson's, but the first was too heavy when it arrived in February 1828. It was rebuilt with six wheels and hailed as a great improvement, Hackworth being told to convert the remaining locomotives as soon as possible. In 1828, two locomotive boilers exploded within four months, both killing the driver and both due to the safety valves being left fixed down while the engine was stationary. Horses were also used on the line, and they could haul up to four waggons. The dandy waggon was introduced in mid-1828; it was a small cart at the end of the train that carried the horse downhill, allowing it to rest while the train sped up. The S&DR made their use compulsory from November 1828.

Passenger traffic started on 10 October 1825, after the required licence was purchased, using the Experiment coach hauled by a horse. The coach was initially timetabled to travel from Stockton to Darlington in two hours, with a fare of 1s, and made a return journey four days a week and a one-way journey on Tuesdays and Saturdays. In April 1826, the operation of the coach was contracted for £200 a year; by then the timetabled journey time had been reduced to 1 hour 15 minutes, and passengers were allowed to travel on the outside for 9d. A more comfortable coach, Express, started the same month and charged 1s 6d for travel inside. Innkeepers began running coaches, two to Shildon from July, and the Union, which served the Yarm branch from 16 October. There were no stations: in Darlington the coaches picked up passengers near the north road crossing, whereas in Stockton they picked up at different places on the quay. Between 30,000 and 40,000 passengers were carried between July 1826 and June 1827.

Founding of Middlesbrough
The export of coal had become the railway's main business, but the staiths at Stockton had inadequate storage and the size of ships was limited by the depth of the Tees. A branch from Stockton to Haverton, on the north bank of the Tees, was proposed in 1826, and the engineer Thomas Storey proposed a shorter and cheaper line to Middlesbrough, south of the Tees in July 1827. Later approved by George Stephenson, this plan was ratified by the shareholders on 26 October. The Tees Navigation Company was about to improve the river and proposed that the railway delay application to Parliament, but, despite opposition, at a meeting in January 1828 it was decided to proceed. A more direct northerly route from Auckland to the Tees had been considered since 1819, and the Tees & Weardale Railway had applied unsuccessfully to Parliament for permission for such a line in 1823, 1824 and 1825. This now became a  line linking Simpasture on the S&DR's line near today's Newton Aycliffe station with Haverton and Stockton, via a route that was  shorter than via the route of the S&DR, and named the Clarence Railway in honour of the Duke of Clarence, later King William IV. Two members of the management committee resigned, as they felt that Stockton would be adversely affected by the line, and Meynell, the S&DR chairman, stepped down from leadership. The Clarence Railway was approved a few days later, with the same gauge as the S&DR. By July 1834, the Exchequer Loan Commissioners had taken control of the Clarence Railway.

The Croft branch opened in October 1829. Construction of the suspension bridge across the Tees started in July 1829, but was suspended in October after the Tees Navigation Company pointed out the S&DR had no permission to cross the Old Channel of the Tees. The S&DR prepared to return to Parliament but withdrew after a design for a drawbridge was agreed with the Navigation Company. The line to Middlesbrough was laid with malleable iron rails weighing , resting on oak blocks. The suspension bridge had been designed to carry 150 tons, but the cast iron retaining plates split when it was tested with just 66 tons and loaded trains had to cross with the waggons split into groups of four linked by a  chain. For the opening ceremony on 27 December 1830, "Globe", a new locomotive designed by Hackworth for passenger trains, hauled people in carriages and waggons fitted with seats across the bridge to the staiths at Port Darlington, which had berths for six ships. Stockton continued to be served by a station on the line to the quay until 1848, when it was replaced by a station on the Middlesbrough line on the other side of the Tees. Before May 1829, Thomas Richardson had bought about  near Port Darlington, and with Joseph and Edward Pease and others he formed the Owners of the Middlesbrough Estate to develop it. Middlesbrough had only a few houses before the coming of the railway, but a year later had a population of over 2,000 and at the 2011 census had over 138,000 people.

Railway improvements

In 1830, the company opened new offices at the corner of Northgate and Union Street in Darlington. Between 1831 and 1832 a second track was laid between Stockton and the foot of Brusselton Bank. Workshops were built at Shildon for the maintenance and construction of locomotives. In 1830 approximately 50 horses shared the traffic with 19 locomotives, but travelled at different speeds, so to help regulate traffic horse-drawn trains were required to operate in groups of four or five. This had led to horses, startled by a passing locomotive and coming off their dandy cart, being run down by the following train. On one occasion a driver fell asleep in the dandy cart of the preceding train and his horse, no longer being led, came to a stop and was run down by a locomotive. The committee decided in 1828 to replace horses with locomotives on the main line, starting with the coal trains, but there was resistance from some colliery owners. The company had returned the five per cent dividend that had been promised by Edward Pease, and this had increased to eight per cent by the time he retired in 1832. When the treasurer Jonathan Backhouse retired in 1833 to become a Quaker minister, he was replaced by Joseph Pease.

The way north

Great North of England Railway

On 13 October 1835, the York and North Midland Railway (Y&NMR) was formed to connect York to London by a line to a junction with the planned North Midland Railway. Representatives of the Y&NMR and S&DR met two weeks later and formed the Great North of England Railway (GNER), a line from York to Newcastle that used the route of the  Croft branch at Darlington. The railway was to be built in sections, and to allow both to open at the same time permission for the more difficult line through the hills from Darlington to Newcastle was to be sought in 1836 and a bill for the easier line south of Darlington to York presented the following year. In August a general meeting decided to start work on the southern section, but construction was delayed, and after several bridges collapsed the engineer Thomas Storey was replaced by Robert Stephenson. The S&DR sold its Croft branch to the GNER, and the railway opened for coal traffic on 4 January 1841 using S&DR locomotives. The railway opened to passengers with its own locomotives on 30 March.

Early in 1842, the nominally independent Shildon Tunnel Company opened its  tunnel through the hills at Shildon to the Wear basin and after laying  of track to South Church station, south of Bishop Auckland, opened in May 1842. In 1846, the S&DR installed Alexander Bain's "I and V" electric telegraph to regulate the passage of trains through the tunnel. The SD&R provided a  hour service between Darlington and Newcastle, with a four-horse omnibus from South Church to Rainton Meadows on the Durham Junction Railway, from where trains ran to Gateshead, on the south side of the River Tyne near Newcastle.

Railway operations in the 1830s
By 1839, the track had been upgraded with rails weighing . The railway had about 30 steam locomotives, most of them six coupled, that ran with four-wheeled tenders with two water butts, each capable of holding  of water. On average there were about 40 coal trains a day, hauling 28 waggons with a weight of 116 tons. There were about 5,000 privately owned waggons, and at any one time about 1,000 stood at Shildon depot.

The railway had modern passenger locomotives, some with four wheels There were passenger stations at Stockton, Middlesbrough, Darlington, Shildon and West Auckland, and trains also stopped at Middlesbrough Junction, Yarm Junction, Fighting Cocks and Heighington. Some of the modified road coaches were still in use, but there were also modern railway carriages, some first class with three compartments each seating eight passengers, and second class carriages that seated up to 40. Luggage and sometimes the guard travelled on the carriage roof; a passenger travelling third class suffered serious injuries after falling from the roof in 1840. Over 200,000 passengers were carried in the year to 1 October 1838, and in 1839 there were twelve trains each day between Middlesbrough and Stockton, six trains between Stockton and Darlington, and three between Darlington and Shildon, where a carriage was fitted with Rankine's self-acting brake, taken over the Brussleton Inclines, and then drawn by a horse to St Helen Auckland. The Bradshaw's railway guide for March 1843, after South Church opened, shows five services a day between Darlington and South Church via Shildon, with three between Shildon and St Helens. Also listed were six trains between Stockton and Hartlepool via Seaton over the Clarence Railway and the Stockton and Hartlepool Railway that had opened in 1841.

By this time, Port Darlington had become overwhelmed by the volume of imports and exports and work started in 1839 on Middlesbrough Dock, which had been laid out by William Cubitt, capable of holding 150 ships, and built by resident civil engineer George Turnbull. The suspension bridge across the Tees was replaced by a cast iron bridge on masonry piers in 1841. After three years and an expenditure of £122,000 (equivalent to £9.65m at 2011 prices), the formal opening of the new dock took place on 12 May 1842. The S&DR provided most of the finance, and the dock was absorbed by the company in 1849.

Newcastle and Darlington Junction Railway

The GNER had authority for a railway from York to Newcastle; it opened to Darlington in 1841 having spent all of its authorised capital and could not start work on the extension to Newcastle. At the time Parliament was considering the route of a railway between England and Scotland and favoured a railway via the west coast. Railway financier George Hudson chaired a meeting of representatives of north-eastern railways that wished a railway to be built via the east coast. In the 1830s a number of railways had opened in the area between Darlington and Newcastle, and Robert Stephenson was engaged to select a route using these railways as much as possible. The Newcastle and Darlington Junction Railway (N&DJR) differed slightly from the GNER route in the southern section before joining the Durham Junction Railway at Rainton and using the Pontop & South Shields Railway from Washington to Brockley Whins, where a new curve onto the Brandling Junction Railway allowed direct access to Gateshead.

The bill was presented unchanged to Parliament in 1842, and was opposed by the S&DR. Despite this, the Newcastle and Darlington Junction Railway Act received royal assent on 18 June 1842, and a second Act the following year secured the deviations from the GNER route in the south recommended by Stephenson. After the opening celebration on 18 June 1844, through services ran from London to Gateshead the following day.

The N&DJR made an offer to lease the GNER and buy it within five years, and GNER shares increased in value by 44 per cent as the N&DJR took over on 1 July 1845; the N&DJR became part of the larger York, Newcastle and Berwick Railway (YN&BR) in 1847.

Wear Valley Railway

The Stanhope and Tyne Railway, a  line between South Shields and Stanhope had opened in 1834. Steam locomotives worked the section east of Annfield, and in the western section inclines were worked by stationary engines or gravity, with horses hauling waggons over level track. The lime kilns and the line between Stanhope and Carrhouse closed in 1840, and with the Stanhope to Annfield section losing money, the insolvent railway company was dissolved on 5 February 1841. The northern section became the Pontop and South Shields Railway and the southern section from Stanhope to Carrhouse was bought by the newly formed Derwent Iron Company at Consett, renamed the Wear & Derwent Railway, and used to transport limestone from quarries in the Stanhope area to its works at Consett. The Weardale Extension Railway ran from Waskerley on the Wear & Derwent to Crook on the BA&WR and included the Sunniside Incline worked by a stationary engine. Sponsored by the Derwent Iron Company, the  line was built by the S&DR and opened on 16 May 1845. A passenger service started to Hownes Gill and Stanhope (Crawley) on 1 September 1845; the Stanhope service was withdrawn at the end of 1846. Travelling north from Crook the carriages and waggons were drawn up the Sunniside Incline, a locomotive hauled the mixed train to Waskerley Park Junction, then they were let down Nanny Mayor's Incline and a locomotive took them forward. When returning, regulations required that the carriages run loose down the Sunniside Incline and they were let to run into Crook station, controlled by the guard using the carriage brakes. Later, a  viaduct replaced the two inclines at Hownes Gill ravine on 1 July 1858. A deviation replacing Nanny's Mayor's Incline, as well as a curve that allowed trains from Crook direct access to Rowley, was opened for freight on 23 May 1859 and for passenger traffic on 4 July 1859.

The Middlesbrough & Redcar Railway, a short extension to Redcar, received permission on 21 July 1845. The line branched off before the Middlesbrough terminus, which was closed and a new through station opened with the line on 4 June 1846. The line opened on 3 August 1847, and the Act also gave the S&DR permission for the Bishopley branch, over which 500,000 tons of limestone travelled in 1868.

Just before the line opened on 22 July 1847, the Wear Valley Railway absorbed the Shildon Tunnel, Bishop Auckland & Weardale Railway, Weardale Extension Railway and Wear & Derwent Railway and then the S&DR leased the Wear Valley Railway and Middlesbrough & Redcar Railways for 999 years. This required a payment of £47,000 each year, exceeding the SD&R's net revenue; traffic from the Derwent Iron Company was reduced during a period of financial difficulty and the Black Boy colliery switched to sending its coal to Hartlepool. No dividend was paid in 1848 and the next few years; lease payments were made out of reserves. The S&DR announced a bill in November 1848 to permit a lease by and amalgamation with the YN&BR, but this was withdrawn after the YN&BR share price crashed and its chairman Hudson resigned after questions were raised about his share dealings. In 1850 the S&DR had share capital of £250,000 but owed £650,000, most of this without the authority of Parliament until 1849; the debt was converted into shares in 1851.

Cleveland iron ore
In mid-1850, Henry Bolckow and John Vaughan discovered a seam of iron ore at Eston. They opened a mine, laid a branch line to the Middlesbrough & Redcar Railway and started hauling ironstone over the S&DR to their blast furnaces west of Bishop Auckland. By 1851, Derwent Iron had opened a mine in the area and began moving ironstone  to Consett, and the S&DR had paid the arrears on its debt and was able to pay a dividend the following year, albeit only 4 per cent; between 1849 and 1853 the traffic more than doubled.

In 1852, the Leeds Northern Railway (LNR) built a line from Northallerton to a junction with the Stockton to Hartlepool line and a section of the route ran parallel to the S&DR alongside the Yarm to Stockton Road. The S&DR was originally on the east side of the road, but the LNR built its line with four tracks on the other side of the road, leasing two to the S&DR for a rental of 1s a year. Rather than allow trains to approach the platform line from either direction, the Board of Trade inspecting officer ruled that trains approaching on a line without a platform must first pass through and then reverse into the platform line.

The Middlesbrough & Guisborough Railway, with two branches into the iron-rich hills, was approved by Parliament on 17 June 1852; Pease had to guarantee dividends to raise the finance needed. The  single-track railway was worked by the S&DR, and opened to minerals on 11 November 1853 and passengers on 25 February 1854. With electric telegraph installed between stations, passenger trains were not permitted to leave a station until confirmation had been received that the line was clear.

By 1857, a blast furnace had opened close to the Durham coalfield on the north side of the Tees. Backed by the rival West Hartlepool Harbour & Railway, the Durham & Cleveland Union Railway proposed a line from the mines in Skinningrove and Staithes, via Guisborough and a bridge over the Middlesbrough & Redcar Railway to a jetty at Cargo Fleet, from where a ferry would carry the ore across the Tees to the blast furnaces. When the proposal was before Parliament the S&DR suggested that their Middlesbrough & Redcar could be extended to Saltburn, and the Tees crossed by a swing bridge. The Cleveland Railway received permission for a line from Skinningrove as far as Guisborough, and the S&DR permission for an extension to Saltburn and a branch to a mine at Skelton. This 1858 S&DR Act also authorised the merger of the S&DR with the railways it held on lease.

An application to Parliament for a jetty in the following year was unsuccessful, but in 1860 the Upsall, Normanby & Ormesby Railway received permission for a line with access to the river, the S&DR claim of exclusive rights to the foreshore having been rejected. The jetty was also opposed by the Tees Conservancy Commissioners and they moored barges along the foreshore to obstruct construction. In what became known as the Battle of the Tees, a fight broke out when a steam tug sent by the Commissioners interrupted men moving the barges. The barges were successfully moved, but a more serious fight developed the following night when three of the Commissioners' steam tugs arrived. The police then kept watch on the works until they were finished.

Henry Pease, a S&DR director and Quaker, visited his brother Joseph in mid-1859 at his house by the sea at Marske-by-the-Sea. Returning late for dinner, he explained he had walked to Saltburn, then a group of fisherman's cottages, where he had had a "sort of prophetic vision" of a town with gardens. With other S&DR directors he planned the town, with gardens and Zetland Hotel by the station, and bought a house at 5 Britannia Terrace, where he stayed for a few weeks every summer. The extension opened in 1861, a station on the through line replacing the terminus at Redcar.

Over Stainmore

A railway to serve Barnard Castle, from the S&DR at a junction near North Road station and along the River Tees, was proposed in 1852; this route bypassed as far as possible the Duke of Cleveland's estate, as he had opposed an earlier railway. An application that year failed, but the Darlington & Barnard Castle Railway Act was given royal assent on 3 July 1854 and the  railway opened on 8 July 1856.

Cleveland iron ore is high in phosphorus and needs to be mixed with purer ores, such as those on the west coast in Cumberland and Lancashire. In the early 1850s, this ore was travelling the long way round over the Newcastle & Carlisle Railway to the Barrow-in-Furness area, and Durham coke was returning. Both the South Durham & Lancashire Union Railway (SD&LUR) and the Eden Valley Railway (EVR) companies were formed on 20 September 1856. Taking advantage of the new railway at Barnard Castle, the SD&LUR crossed the Pennines via Kirkby Stephen to meet the West Coast Main Line (WCML) at Tebay, on the section then controlled by the Lancaster & Carlisle Railway, and also linked Barnard Castle with West Auckland. The EVR was a branch from Kirkby Stephen to the WCML near Penrith via Appleby. The routes were surveyed by Thomas Bouch and SD&LUR received permission on 13 July 1857. The EVR route followed the east bank of the River Eden, a mile longer than a more expensive route on the west bank, and its Act received royal assent on 21 May 1858.

Bouch had laid out an economical route that followed the contours and avoided tunnels, but there were formidable gradients up to the  Stainmore Summit. A new station was built to replace the terminus at Barnard Castle. A mineral train ran between Barnard Castle and Barras on 26 March 1861, and mineral traffic worked through to Tebay from 4 July 1861. There was an opening ceremony on 7 August 1861 and the SD&LUR west of Barnard Castle opened to passengers the following day. Two 4-4-0 locomotives with enclosed cabs had been built for the line in 1860 by Stephenson and Co, and the S&DR worked traffic from the start: two return services a day were provided for passengers. The EVR opened to mineral traffic on 8 April 1862 and passengers on 9 June 1862, to the south-facing junction at Clifton (later ). The L&CR agreed to allow the S&DR running rights over its line and services were extended to Penrith from 1 August 1863.

Progress and amalgamation

In 1854, there were five or six trains a day between Darlington and Redcar and three a day between Darlington and Frosterley. Horses were still used on trains in the mid-1850s: a horse-drawn coach was still independently operated between Middlesbrough and Stockton in 1854 on Sundays, as the only S&DR services that run on that day were the mail trains, and locomotives replaced horses on passenger trains to West Auckland in 1856. The S&DR opened a carriage works south of Darlington North Road station in 1853 and later it built a locomotive works nearby to replace its works at Shildon. Designed by William Bouch, who had taken over from Hackworth as Locomotive Supervisor in 1840, it completed its first locomotive in 1864. In 1858 the Brusselton Inclines were bypassed by a line from the north end of Shildon Tunnel; the same year a passenger service started on the Hagger Leases branch and a mineral line opened from Crook via two inclines to Waterhouse. The section of the SD&LUR between West Auckland and Barnard Castle opened for minerals in July 1863 and passengers on 1 August 1863, together with a direct line from Bishop Auckland to West Auckland. Stations at Evenwood and Cockfield replaced stations on the Hagger Leases branch.

In 1859, a company had been formed to link the Newcastle & Carlisle Railway with the SD&R via the Derwent Valley; by 1860 this had grown into the Newcastle, Derwent & Weardale Railway, which now bypassed the SD&R and linked with the SD&LUR, and the North British and London and North Western (LNWR) railways were providing two-thirds of the capital. The LNWR proposed to build warehouses in Hartlepool and buy shares in the West Hartlepool Harbour & Railway. The North Eastern Railway (NER), formed in 1854 by amalgamation, at the time was the largest railway company in the country and controlled the East Coast Main Line from Knottingley, south of York, through Darlington to Berwick-upon-Tweed. When they approached the S&DR with a proposal to merge, the directors deciding they preferred a merger with the NER than eventually becoming part of the LNWR, entered negotiations. Opposed by the NER, the Newcastle, Derwent & Weardale Railway bill was approved by the House of Commons in 1861, but the line was eventually rejected by the House of Lords. The SD&LUR and EVR were absorbed by the S&DR on 30 June 1862.

With  of line and about 160 locomotives, the Stockton and Darlington Railway became part of the North Eastern Railway on 13 July 1863. Due to a clause in the Act, the railway was managed as the independent Darlington Section until 1876, when the lines became the NER's Central Division.

Later history
The NER had built a branch in the late 1850s from Durham to Bishop Auckland, but used a separate station in the town until December 1867, when all services began to use the S&DR station. The Sunniside Incline was replaced by a deviation, albeit with gradients of 1 in 51 and 1 in 52, which opened for mineral traffic on 10 April 1867 and for passengers on 2 March 1868; after 1868 trains on this line were extended to serve Benfieldside station (later known as Blackhill and then Consett). In Cleveland, a branch from Nunthorpe to Battersby opened on 1 June 1864; passengers were carried from 1 April 1868. A branch from Barnard Castle to Middleton-in-Teesdale opened on 12 May 1868.

The locomotive works at Darlington operated independently under Bouch until 1875, the locomotives having been renumbered by the NER a few years earlier. There was a varied range of locomotives, but the most common type was used on the mineral trains and had a wheel arrangement of 0-6-0; the later engines were of the Stephenson long boilered type. Most passenger locomotives had four driven wheels in the form 2-4-0; some were 2-2-2. Bouch had designed two bogie 4-4-0 locomotives for the line over Stainmore in 1860, and another fourteen with this wheel arrangement had been built by 1874. S&DR services and those on the ECML called at different stations in Darlington until 1887, when S&DR trains were diverted through a rebuilt Darlington Bank Top station, rejoining the route to Stockton from a junction south of Darlington and a new line to Oak Tree Junction. An extension from Stanhope to  opened in 1895, and the line over Stainmore to Tebay was doubled by the end of the century.

From 1913 former S&DR lines were electrified with 1,500 Vdc overhead lines and electric locomotives hauled coal trains between Shildon and Erimus Marshalling Yard, which had opened in 1908 between Middlesbrough and Thornaby. The trains took the former S&DR line from Shildon to Simpasture Junction, joining the former Clarence Railway line to Carlton, where a later line allowed access to the Stockton to Middlesbrough extension. The locomotives operated for 20 years, but then coal traffic had reduced, which made it uneconomical to maintain the electrification system.

As a result of the Railways Act 1921, on 1 January 1923 the North Eastern Railway became the North Eastern area of the London and North Eastern Railway (LNER). The passenger service was withdrawn north of Tow Law on 1 May 1939. Britain's railways were nationalised on 1 January 1948 and the lines were placed under the control of British Railways. In the early 1950s control was split between the North Eastern and London Midland regions with Kirkby Stephen as the boundary. Local passenger trains were withdrawn between Kirkby Stephen and Tebay on 1 December 1952. The service along Weardale was withdrawn on 29 June 1953 and services north of Crook on 11 June 1956.

The 1955 Modernisation Plan, known formally as the "Modernisation and Re-Equipment of the British Railways", was published in December 1954. With the aim of increasing speed and reliability steam trains were replaced with electric and diesel traction. From 1954 diesel multiple units took over passenger services in the north east except those on the ECML, and were introduced to the line over Stainmore in February 1958. The passenger service was withdrawn between Barnard Castle and Penrith on 20 January 1962, and between Bishop Auckland and Barnard Castle on 12 June 1962.

In 1963, Richard Beeching published his report The Reshaping of British Railways, which recommended closing the network's least used stations and lines. This included the remaining former S&DR lines except for the line between Darlington and Saltburn via Stockton and Middlesbrough. Passenger service between Nunthorpe and Guisborough was withdrawn in 1964; the service between Middlesbrough and Nunthorpe was retained. The line between Darlington and Barnard Castle and the branch to Middleton-in-Teesdale were closed to passengers on 30 November 1964. Trains were withdrawn north of Bishop Auckland on 8 March 1965, but the passenger service to Bishop Auckland was saved because of regional development concerns.

Locomotives

Accidents and incidents
On 19 March 1828, the boiler of locomotive No. 5 exploded at Simpasture Junction. One of the two firemen was killed, the other severely scalded. The driver (George Stephenson's older brother) was unharmed.
On 1 July 1828, the boiler of Locomotion No. 1 exploded at  station, killing the driver.
On 4 April 1865 at Hartburn (Stockton), the 3:55 pm passenger train from Darlington to Saltburn collided with some chaldron wagons which had become detached from a Shildon to Middlesbrough coal train. Though this was not a serious accident it was to result in the S&DR adopting the block system, well before their colleagues at the NER headquarters in York felt this to be necessary. At a conference the next day attended by several company officials including Thomas MacNay and William Bouch it was noted that one of the options to achieve greater security was ‘to adopt the ‘block’ system of telegraph at intervals of 2 or 3 miles; that is not to allow an engine to pass any of such stations until it has been signalled that the previous train was passed the station to which it was approaching.’

Anniversary celebrations

The Stockton and Darlington was not the first railway and a train had previously carried passengers, but its opening in 1825 was seen as proof of the effectiveness of steam railways as a means of public transport. A jubilee was held on 27 and 28 September 1875 to celebrate the fiftieth anniversary of the opening of the world's first steam operated public railway: the Darlington North Road workshops housed a locomotive exhibition, a statue of Joseph Pease was unveiled in Darlington, his portrait presented to the Darlington Corporation and a banquet held. Fifty years later centenary celebrations were held in July to allow foreign men visiting the International Railway Congress to take part. An exhibition of rolling stock at the new Faverdale Wagon Works in Darlington was opened by the Duke and Duchess of York (later King George VI and the Queen Mother). The following day the royal couple watched as procession of locomotives passed between Stockton and Oak Tree Junction, starting with a Hetton Colliery locomotive that had been built in 1822 and finishing with a replica train of ten chaldron waggons and "the company's coach" hauled by Locomotive No.1 propelled by a petrol engine in a specially built tender.

A festival was held in Belle Vue, Manchester on 27 September 1925, a Sunday to allow railwaymen to attend, where a pageant showed how transport had changed through time, beginning with a group of ancient Britons dragging a log with their belongings on top and ending with Stephenson's Rocket; another procession included Locomotion No.1, propelled by its tender, and more modern locomotives. On 31 August 1975, to celebrate the 150th anniversary, a cavalcade was held between Shildon and Heighington, where a replica of Locomotion headed a procession of locomotives, which was completed by the prototype high-speed train. In the same year the National Railway Museum opened in York, combining exhibits from the former LNER museum in York, which had opened after the 1875 festivities, and from the National Transport Museum at Clapham.

Legacy
The current Tees Valley Line uses the most of the former Stockton and Darlington Railway between Bishop Auckland and Saltburn. From Bishop Auckland the non-electrified line is single track to Shildon, double track to Heighington, and single track to the junction with the East Coast Main Line north of Darlington. This section is a Community Rail service called the Bishop line, and is sometimes known as the Heritage Line because of its links with the S&DR. South of Darlington, trains take the 1887 line before joining the original 1825 route to Stockton at the site of Oak Tree Junction. The former Middlesbrough & Guisborough Railway line is open between Guisborough Junction and Nunthorpe as part of the Community Rail Esk Valley Line to Whitby.

On 14 June 2007, during excavations for road building, some of the original stone sleepers used by the railway in 1825 were discovered intact near Lingfield Point. Officials involved in the road project hope to preserve the stones along a new bicycle path.

 a two train per hour off-peak service is provided by Northern between Saltburn and Darlington, and ten trains a day continue to Bishop Auckland. One train per hour leaves Middlesbrough going south to Manchester Airport via Yarm and another travels north to Newcastle via Sunderland. There are eighteen trains a day between Middlesbrough and Nunthorpe, and four of these continue to Whitby. Tees Valley Unlimited, the local enterprise partnership, published  its ambition to improve passenger services, with the priority of an all day two trains an hour service over the Darlington to Saltburn and Nunthorpe to Hartlepool routes using new trains; additional platforms are needed at Darlington station to allow this service frequency. A station serving James Cook University Hospital opened in May 2014. A Hitachi train plant opened in September 2015 at Newton Aycliffe to build trains for the Intercity Express Programme.

At North Road railway station, the station buildings and goods shed are Grade II* listed. The station building is now the Head of Steam – Darlington Railway Museum, which has particular reference to the Stockton & Darlington Railway and housed Locomotion No. 1, until it was moved in March 2021. Nearby, the former carriage works are now used as workshops for steam locomotives. A little further east is Skerne Bridge, the oldest railway bridge in continuous use in the world. At Shildon is "Locomotion" or National Railway Museum Shildon, part of the National Railway Museum, which contains heritage railway vehicles, now including Locomotion No. 1. The site includes Timothy Hackworth's house, the Soho Workshop and a former coal drops, which are listed buildings. The heritage Weardale Railway runs special services over its line from Bishop Auckland to Eastgate-in-Weardale.

Notes and references

Notes

References

Sources

Further reading

External links

Original report by George Stephenson on the proposal to construct the railay (Network Rail)
The History of the Stockton and Darlington Railway (North East History)
The Stockton and Darlington Railway
The Bishop Line to Bishop Auckland
 
Historic Environment Audit October 2016 (2019 revision)

 
Railway companies established in 1821
Railway lines opened in 1825
Railway companies disestablished in 1863
Early British railway companies
History of County Durham
Rail transport in County Durham
Transport in the Borough of Stockton-on-Tees
North Eastern Railway (UK)
Rail transport in Darlington
Horse-drawn railways
Standard gauge railways in England
British companies established in 1821
Stockton-on-Tees
4 ft 8 in gauge railways
George Stephenson
British companies disestablished in 1863